Gertraud Jesserer (13 December 1943 – 9 December 2021) was an Austrian film and television actress. Jesserer was the wife of German actor Peter Vogel and the mother of actor-journalist Nikolas Vogel. She died in a house fire in Vienna on 9 December 2021, at the age of 77.

Selected filmography
 Eva (1958)
 The Inheritance of Bjorndal (1960)
 The Cry of the Wild Geese (1961)
 My Daughter and I (1963)
 Condemned to Sin (1964)
 I Learned It from Father (1964)
  (1973)
  (1976)
  (1997)
 Debt of Love (1997)
 Baby Rex - Der kleine Kommissar (1997)
 Germanija (2002)
 Soundless (2004)
 Il Commissario Rex (2008-2011)

References

External links
 

1943 births
2021 deaths
20th-century Austrian actresses
21st-century Austrian actresses
Actresses from Vienna
Austrian film actresses
Austrian television actresses
Deaths from fire